Panther Creek Consolidated Independent School District is a public school district based in the community of Valera, Texas,  United States. It also serves Talpa.

The district was created on July 1, 1986, by the consolidation of the Mozelle and Talpa Centennial districts. The Texas Education Agency (TEA) recorded it as the Talpa Centennial district consolidating into Mozelle.

In 2009, the school district was rated "recognized" by the TEA.

Schools
Panther Creek High School (grades 6-12)
Panther Creek Elementary School (prekindergarten-grade 5)

Special programs

Athletics
Panther Creek High School plays six-man football.

See also

List of school districts in Texas

References

External links
Panther Creek Consolidated ISD

School districts in Coleman County, Texas
School districts in Runnels County, Texas